Two ships of the United States Navy have borne the name Richard E. Byrd, in honor of polar explorer Rear Admiral Richard E. Byrd (1888–1957).

  was a  guided missile destroyer, launched in 1962 and struck in 1992. The ship was sold to Greece to provide spare parts for other ships, and sunk as a target in 2003.

United States Navy ship names